The 2021 Malaysia Cup knockout stage will be played from 14 November to 30 November 2021, with the top two teams from every four groups from the group stage advancing to the knockout stage beginning with the quarter-finals followed by the semi-finals and the finals. This stage will be played in two legs except for the finals which is played once.

Schedule
The draw for the 2021 Malaysia Cup was held on 15 September 2021.

Format
The knockout phase involves the eight teams which qualified as the winners or runners-up of each of the four groups in the group stage.

Each tie in the knockout phase was played over two legs, apart from the final, with each team playing one leg at home. The team that scored more goals on aggregate over the two legs advanced to the next round. If the aggregate score was level, the away goals rule was applied, i.e. the team that scored more goals away from home over the two legs advanced. If away goals were also equal, then thirty minutes of extra time was played. The away goals rule was again applied after extra time, i.e. if there were goals scored during extra time and the aggregate score was still level, the visiting team advanced by virtue of more away goals scored. If no goals were scored during extra time, the tie was decided by penalty shoot-out. In the final, which was played as a single match, if scores were level at the end of normal time, extra time was played, followed by a penalty shoot-out if scores remained tied.

The mechanism of the draws for each round was as follows:
In the draw for the quarter-final, the four group winners were seeded, and the four group runners-up were unseeded. The seeded teams were drawn against the unseeded teams, with the seeded teams hosting the second leg. Teams from the same group or the same association could not be drawn against each other.
In the draws for the quarter-finals onwards, there were no seedings, and teams from the same group or the same association could be drawn against each other.

Qualified teams

Bracket

The bracket was decided after the draw for the round of 16, which was held on 6 October 2022 at the MFL House in Kuala Lumpur.

Quarter-finals

The first legs were played on 14 November, and the second legs were played on 18 November 2021.

First leg

Second leg

Kuala Lumpur won 3–0 on aggregate.

Melaka United won 3–1 on aggregate.

Terengganu won 6–3 on aggregate.

Johor Darul Ta'zim won 1–0 on aggregate.

Semi-finals

The first legs were played on 22 November, and the second legs were played on 26 November 2021.

First leg

Second leg

2–2 on aggregate. Kuala Lumpur City won 5–3 on penalties.

Johor Darul Ta'zim won 4–1 on aggregate.

Final

The final will be played at the Bukit Jalil National Stadium in Kuala Lumpur, Malaysia on 30 November 2021.

Notes

References

Malaysia Cup knockout phase
Football cup competitions in Malaysia